Christopher Georges Johan von Tangen (29 June 1877 – 22 December 1941) was a Norwegian épée and foil fencer. He competed in three events at the 1912 Summer Olympics.

References

External links
 

1877 births
1941 deaths
Norwegian male foil fencers
Olympic fencers of Norway
Fencers at the 1912 Summer Olympics
Sportspeople from Paris
Norwegian male épée fencers
20th-century Norwegian people